In Greek mythology, Ismene (Ismēnē) is the daughter and half-sister of Oedipus, daughter and granddaughter of Jocasta, and sister of Antigone, Eteocles, and Polynices. She appears in several plays of Sophocles: at the end of Oedipus Rex, in Oedipus at Colonus and in Antigone.  She also appears at the end of Aeschylus' Seven Against Thebes.

In Sophocles

Oedipus Rex ball 
Ismene is not named, but is seen at the end of Oedipus Rex as her father/brother laments the "shame" and "sorrow" he is leaving her and her sister to. Oedipus begs Creon to watch over them, but in his grief reaches to take them with him as he is led away. Creon prevents him from taking his daughters out of the city with him.

Oedipus at Colonus 
Ismene appears in Oedipus at Colonus to tell her father of the situation in Thebes and the rivalry of his sons. She explains that Eteocles has taken the throne from Polynices and driven him out of the city. As a result of this, Polynices gathered his own army to either take back the city "or to die there with honor." According to the Oracle of Delphi, the location where Oedipus is buried will determine the result of the war between the brothers. Ismene tells her father that Creon plans to have him buried on the border of Thebes so that they will have the desirable outcome. Hearing this, Oedipus curses his sons and refuses to leave Colonus.

The chorus (in this play the elders of Colonus) tell him that because he has walked on the sacred ground of the Eumenides, he has to "perform rites of purification." Due to his blindness and age, Oedipus is unable to fulfill this task and asks one of his daughters to instead. Ismene agrees and exits to do so.

Later in the play, in an attempt to force Oedipus to return to Thebes, Creon tells him that he has seized Ismene and takes Antigone away as well. However, Theseus and the Athenians overpower them and exit to free the girls.

Ismene appears again at the end of the play with her sister as they mourn the death of their father and lament that they cannot join him. Theseus tells them that Oedipus has been buried but the location is secret and he has forbidden that they be told of it. Antigone resolves to return to Thebes, and Ismene goes with her.

Antigone 
In the opening scene of the play Antigone tells Ismene of her plans to bury their brother Polynices, and asks her to join her. While Ismene laments the fate of Polynices' corpse, she refuses to defy the laws of the city. She advises her sister to be secretive if she is determined to take this course of action, and says she will do the same. Antigone, however, tells her not to keep silent but to tell everyone in the city. Ismene does not stop her sister, but makes her opinion of her foolishness clear.

Once Antigone is caught, in spite of her betrothal to his son Haemon, Creon decrees that she is to be buried alive. Ismene then declares that she has aided Antigone and wants to share her fate, though she did not participate in the crime. Antigone refuses to let her be martyred for a cause she did not stand up for, telling her to live. Antigone expresses that while Ismene's "choices seemed right to some--others agreed with [hers]," but Ismene tells her that the both of them were "equally wrong."

Seven Against Thebes 
Aeschylus' play, Seven Against Thebes, depicts the war and demise of Eteocles and Polynices. At the end of the play the Chorus narrates Ismene and Antigone entering to sing a funeral dirge together for both of their brothers. While Antigone exits with the First Semichorus, escorting the body of Polynices, Ismene and the Second Semichorus exit with the body of Eteocles.

Other appearances 

The 7th-century BC poet Mimnermus accounts that Ismene was murdered by Tydeus, one of the Seven. In this account, Ismene and her lover Theoclymenus met outside of the city during the siege. Tydeus had been told their whereabouts by Athena, and apprehended Ismene while Theoclymenus escaped. While she begged for sympathy, Tydeus was unaffected by her pleas and killed her.

This is mentioned in no other extant Classical writing, but the scene is represented on a 6th-century Corinthian black-figure amphora now housed in the Louvre.

Genealogy

References

 Antigone Alone is a one-woman play by actor and writer Michael McEvoy, based on the fifth century BC tragedy Antigone by Sophocles. It premiered on 14 May 2018 at the Brighton Festival
 Ismene is a central narrator of the novel The Children of Jocasta by Natalie Haynes, published in 2017.
 Tyrtaeus, Solon, Theognis, Mimnermus. Greek Elegiac Poetry: From the Seventh to the Fifth Centuries BC. Edited and translated by Douglas E. Gerber. Loeb Classical Library 258. Cambridge, MA: Harvard University Press, 1999.

Princesses in Greek mythology
Theban characters in Greek mythology